Memecylon discolor is a species of plant in the family Melastomataceae. It is endemic to Sri Lanka.

References

Endemic flora of Sri Lanka
discolor
Endangered plants
Taxonomy articles created by Polbot
Taxa named by Alfred Cogniaux